Ternate is a comune (municipality) in the Province of Varese in the Italian region Lombardy, located about  northwest of Milan and about  southwest of Varese.

Ternate borders the following municipalities: Biandronno, Cazzago Brabbia, Comabbio, Inarzo, Travedona-Monate, Varano Borghi.

Demographic evolution

References

External links
 www.comune.ternate.va.it/

Cities and towns in Lombardy